"The Lord" is a song by the Bee Gees. It was released as the B-side of "Don't Forget to Remember" in August 1969 and later included on Cucumber Castle in early 1970.

Background
Written by Barry and Maurice Gibb, "The Lord" is written in the style of a country gospel track with a fast-picked guitar introduction and a lyric looking forward to an eternity in Heaven and pledging to believe in The Lord till death. As none of the Gibb brothers ever professed to be Christians, it would seem that here they are aping a style rather than expressing their own beliefs. The opening chord was D, the chords at first and second verse was D and A, the chords on chorus was G, D, A7, A and D. The music video for the song was taken on the film Cucumber Castle. "The Lord" was released as a B-side of "Don't Forget to Remember" in August 1969, but in Canada, "I Lay Down and Die" was the B-side. On the intro, someone says a Play you a song.

Recording
The July 1969 sessions were the last session with drummer Colin Petersen who was fired from the band in August.

Personnel
 Barry Gibb — lead, harmony and backing vocals, acoustic guitar
 Maurice Gibb — harmony and backing vocals, acoustic and bass guitar
 Colin Petersen — drums

References

Bee Gees songs
1969 songs
Songs written by Barry Gibb
Songs written by Robin Gibb
Song recordings produced by Robert Stigwood
Song recordings produced by Barry Gibb
Song recordings produced by Maurice Gibb